Parul Ghosh (1915–13 August 1977) was an Indian playback singer.

Career
Ghosh sang in Hindi and Bengali movies from 1935 to 1951. Hailing from Barisal (now in Bangladesh), she was introduced to playback singing by her brother Anil Biswas. Films in which she featured include Jwar Bhata, Milan, Hamaari Baat and Namaste. In her early career she was associated with New Theatres, Kolkata.

Personal life and death
Ghosh was married to the flautist Pannalal Ghosh in 1924. Ghosh died on 13 August 1977 in Malad, Mumbai.

References 

1977 deaths
People from Barisal
Indian women playback singers
University of Calcutta alumni
20th-century Indian singers
20th-century Indian women singers
Singers from Mumbai
Women musicians from Maharashtra
1915 births